Susan Jones is a British computational biologist and bioinformatics group leader at the James Hutton Institute. Her work is specially focused on plant pathogen diagnostics, particularly virus diagnostics, using large datasets of RNA-Seq data. She also works on functional genomics, transcription regulation, protein-protein and protein-nucleic-acid interactions.,

Biography

Education
In 1990, she received her Bachelor of Science in Biology from the University of York.

In 1995, she earned her Doctor of Philosophy in Bioinformatics/ Biochemistry from University College London.

Career
She began her scientific career as a research fellow at University College London, Cancer Research UK and EMBL-EBI.

She went on to hold bioinformatics lecturer and bioinformatics senior lecturer positions at the University of Sussex.

From 2011 to 2020, Jones was a senior scientist in computational biology at the James Hutton Institute in Dundee, United Kingdom. Since 2020, she is the bioinformatics group leader there.

Selected publications
Jones has over 60 publications. Some of them have been cited over 3000 times each.

References

External links 
 

British scientists
20th-century women
21st-century women
Alumni of the University of York
Alumni of University College London
British women scientists
Living people
Year of birth missing (living people)